Dawson Lee Garcia (born September 20, 2001) is an American college basketball player for the Minnesota Golden Gophers of the Big Ten Conference. He previously played for the Marquette Golden Eagles and the North Carolina Tar Heels.

High school career
Garcia attended Prior Lake High School in Savage, Minnesota and was coached by Jon Miller. He averaged 8.8 points per game as a freshman followed by 21.4 points per game as a sophomore. Garcia missed 12 games as a junior. As a junior, Garcia averaged 27.5 points and 11.0 rebounds per game. He helped the team to a school-record 25–4 season and the Minnesota Class 4A, Section 2 championship game. As a senior, he averaged 32 points per game. He was named a McDonald's All-American. He was also one of the five finalists for the Minnesota Mr. Basketball award. Garcia surpassed the 2,000 point milestone on February 24, 2020, finishing with 35 points in a 90–76 victory against Eagan High School.

Recruiting
Garcia was considered the No. 32 prospect and No. 2 in Minnesota in the class of 2020 by 247Sports. On November 22, 2019, he committed to playing college basketball for Marquette over offers from Minnesota, Indiana, Memphis, Kansas and North Carolina. Garcia chose the Golden Eagles due to his strong relationship with coach Steve Wojciechowski and his staff. Wojciechowski began recruiting Garcia in June 2018, and Garcia took an official visit in February 2019. "I felt like part of their family there," Garcia said of his commitment.

College career

In Garcia's college debut on November 26, 2020, he scored 19 points in a 99–57 win against Arkansas–Pine Bluff. On February 10, 2021, he scored a season-high 28 points against Villanova. Garcia averaged 13 points and a team-high 6.6 rebounds per game. After the season, he declared for the 2021 NBA draft while maintaining his college eligibility. Concurrently, he entered his name into the NCAA's Transfer Portal.

Garcia committed to North Carolina on July 8, 2021. He joined fellow transfers Brady Manek and Justin McKoy as members of head coach Hubert Davis' first Tar Heel team. On January 27, 2022, Garcia took a leave of absence from the team to deal with some family health issues. On February 10, 2022, it was announced that Garcia would miss the rest of the season to be with his family. He averaged nine points and 5.5 rebounds per game in 16 games. Following the season, Garcia entered the transfer portal, citing the family issues of the past year and his desire to be closer to family. On April 18, 2022, Garcia announced that his transfer to Minnesota.

National team career
In 2019, Garcia helped the United States win its first gold medal at the FIBA 3x3 Under-18 World Cup in Ulaanbaatar, Mongolia. He accumulated 52 points, tying for the most points in the tournament. Garcia was named MVP of the event as well as the 2019 USA Basketball Men's 3x3 U18 National Championship.

Career statistics

College

|-
| style="text-align:left;"| 2020–21
| style="text-align:left;"| Marquette
| 27 || 27 || 29.7 || .480 || .356 || .783 || 6.6 || .8 || .3 || .5 || 13.0
|-
| style='text-align:left;"| 2021–22
| style="text-align:left;"| North Carolina
| 16 || 12 || 20.6 || .405 || .375 || .792 || 5.5 || .7 || .4 || .3 || 9.0
|- class="sortbottom"
| style="text-align:center;" colspan="2"| Career
| 43 || 39 || 26.3 || .457 || .362 || .786 || 6.2 || .7 || .3 || .4 || 11.5

References

External links
Minnesota Golden Gophers bio
North Carolina Tar Heels bio
Marquette Golden Eagles bio
USA Basketball bio

2001 births
Living people
American men's basketball players
Basketball players from Minnesota
McDonald's High School All-Americans
Marquette Golden Eagles men's basketball players
North Carolina Tar Heels men's basketball players
People from Burnsville, Minnesota
People from Prior Lake, Minnesota
Power forwards (basketball)